Kidnapping Game is a 2020 Chinese streaming television series that premiered on iQiyi on June 2, 2020. It is directed by Zang Xichuan, and stars Zhu Yawen, Gina Jin, Geng Le and Liu Yijun. It is adapted from Keigo Higashino's detective thriller with the same name. It is the first drama as part of iQiyi's Light On Theater, followed by The Bad Kids.

Synopsis 
Yu Hai (Zhu Yawen), an owner of a game cafe, is suddenly divested by Shen Hui (Liu Yijun). He accidentally meets Shen Hui's illegitimate daughter Lu Jie (Gina Jin) and the two conspire the fake "kidnapping" of Lu Jie as revenge against the cruel businessman. The two fall in love, but after they successfully receive the ransom, they part. Days later, Lu Jie is found dead, and Yu Hai must find the truth behind her murder.

Cast 

 Zhu Yawen as Yu Hai
 Gina Jin as Lu Jie (Shen Yun)
 Liu Yijun as Shen Hui
 Han Minglin as young Shen Hui
 Geng Le as Wu Yuke
 Ni Dahong as Tian Peng
 Zhang Cheng as young Tian Peng
 Sarina as Yu Hai's mother
 Yang Haoyu as Xu Lifeng
 Li Shengrong as young Xu Lifeng
 Chang Yue as President Gu
 Xing Hanqing as Zhang Bao
 Zhao Chengshun as Han Wei
 Dong Xiangrong as Pan Longlong
 Shao Shengjie as Lu Guangxin
 Zhao Bin as Du Lei
 Zu Qian as Liu Ju
 Fu Yong as Technical Branch Senior Officer
 Feng Xuanyi as Han Chufan
 Zang Bochen as Gao Li
 An Baiyi as Li Wen
 Xia Zhenyan as Gu Man
 Xu Zihan as Xiao Yuhai

Soundtrack

Reception 
Kidnapping Game currently earns a 7.5 on Douban with more than 43,000 user reviews.

References

External links 

 Kidnapping Game on Weibo
 Kidnapping Game on Douban

Chinese period television series
2020 Chinese television series debuts
2020 Chinese television series endings
Mandarin-language television shows
Chinese web series
IQIYI original programming
Television shows based on Japanese novels
Television shows based on works by Keigo Higashino